The 1964 Indiana gubernatorial election was held on November 3, 1964.

Incumbent Democratic Governor Matthew E. Welsh was term-limited.

Democratic nominee Roger D. Branigin defeated Republican nominee Richard O. Ristine with 56.18% of the vote. This would be the Last time until 1988 in which the Democrats won the governorship 

, this marks the most recent time that Democrats won the races for Governor and for President concurrently.

Nominations
Until 1976, all nominations for statewide office in Indiana were made by state conventions.

Democratic nomination

Candidates
Roger D. Branigin, former president of the Indiana State Bar Association
Clinton Green, executive secretary of the Indiana Port Commission
Marshall F. Kizer, Indiana Senate minority leader

Results
The Democratic convention was held on June 12, 1964.

Republican primary

Candidates
William G. Bray, incumbent U.S. Representative for Indiana's 7th congressional district
G. Richard Ellis, former State Senator
Robert E. Gates, Indiana's 4th congressional district Republican chairman
Robert E. Hughes, incumbent Indiana State Treasurer
Earl F. Landgrebe, State Senator
Charles O. Hendricks, incumbent Secretary of State of Indiana
Richard O. Ristine, incumbent Lieutenant Governor of Indiana

Results
The Republican convention was held on June 9, 1964.

General election

Candidates

Chester G. Bohannon, Prohibition
Gordon A. Long, Socialist Labor, candidate for the U.S. Senate in 1956
Roger D. Branigin, Democratic
Richard O. Ristine, Republican

Results

References

Bibliography
 
 

1964
Indiana
Gubernatorial
November 1964 events in the United States